Rema-Rema were a short-lived English music group, consisting of Gary Asquith (guitar/vocals), Marco Pirroni (guitar), Michael Allen (bass/vocals), Mark Cox (keyboards) and Dorothy Prior (drums, generally known only as "Max").

History
Asquith and Allen went to the same school. After his departure from punk band The Models, Allen asked Asquith to join in a new project, called Rema-Rema. However, the band dissolved when Marco Pirroni joined Adam and the Ants.

Pirroni had been an original member of Siouxsie and the Banshees, and was a short-time integrant of Cowboys International, but shortly afterwards went on to fame as a member of Adam and the Ants. Asquith, Allen, and Cox went on to form another short-lived band Mass, which then split up to form Renegade Soundwave (Asquith) and The Wolfgang Press (Allen and Cox). Max later joined Psychic TV, and also recorded a single "I Confess" under the name Dorothy, cowritten with Alex Fergusson, released on Industrial Records in 1980. 

Their sole four-track EP, Wheel In The Roses (released 1980 on 4AD), featured one side of studio recordings and another of live material. Their songs "Fond Affections" and "Rema-Rema" were later covered by This Mortal Coil and Big Black respectively. Two live tracks from the Acklam Hall gig of April 1979, "Why Ask Why?" and "Christopher" appeared on the tape only release, The Men With the Deadly Dreams, on White Stains in 1981.

In 2022, a documentary about the band, called "What you could not visualise" was also directed by Italian-Canadian film-maker Marco Porsia and premiered on 10 November 2022 at the Doc N Roll Film Festival in London

Discography
Releases
 Wheel in the Roses EP (1980)
 Fond Reflections   2x CD (2019)
Compilation appearances
 Natures Mortes - Still Lives (1981)

References

External links 
4AD Rema-Rema Profile
Eyesore database: Rema-Rema
The Story of "I Confess"
Doc'n'Roll documentary "What You Could Not Visualise": REMA REMA - 2022 by Marco Porsia

4AD artists
English post-punk music groups
English rock music groups